Streptococcus lactarius is a species of Streptococcus. First reported in 2010, it was found growing in the breast milk of three non-related healthy women. Based on 16S rRNA gene sequences, it is most similar to S. peroris.

References

External links
 Type strain of Streptococcus lactarius at BacDive -  the Bacterial Diversity Metadatabase

Gram-positive bacteria
Bacteria described in 2010
Streptococcaceae